Dupree–Moore Farm, also known as the Thomas Dupree House, is a historic home and tobacco farm located near Falkland, Pitt County, North Carolina.  The house was built between about 1800 and 1825, as a 1 1/2-story, three bay, frame dwelling. It was enlarged to two stories and rear additions added and remodeled in the Greek Revival style about 1848. A two-story rear "T" addition was added about 1861.  The house features a one-story full-width shed-roof front porch with Picturesque-style latticework. Also on the property are the contributing smokehouse (c. 1910), tobacco grading house (c. 1910), pump house/utility shed (c. 1938), frame equipment shelter (c. 1955), mule barn (c. 1905), tobacco packhouse (c. 1910), tenant house (c. 1922), tenant tobacco packhouse (c. 1922), sweet potato house (c. 1910), log tobacco barn (c. 1942), tobacco barn (c. 1951), and tobacco packhouse (c. 1951).

It was added to the National Register of Historic Places in 2012.

References

Farms on the National Register of Historic Places in North Carolina
Greek Revival houses in North Carolina
Houses completed in 1825
Buildings and structures in Pitt County, North Carolina
National Register of Historic Places in Pitt County, North Carolina